Manikandan Pattambi is an Indian television, stage, and film actor. He's best known for his roles in Malayalam television. He became famous for his character Sathyasheelan in the sitcom Marimayam, a social satire in Mazhavil Manorama. He has also acted in a few supporting roles in various Malayalam films.

Personal life
He is married and has two daughters.

Awards
 2000 kerala sangeetha nataka acadami award for best actor.play uyirthudi
 2003 kerala state television award for best supporting character devamanasamshort film
 2009 kerala state television award for best actor unaru short film
 2011 Kerala State Television Award for Best Comedian - Marimayam

Television

Filmography

As an actor

Dialogue
 Vallatha Pahayan (2013)

Screenplay
 mankolangal(2000)
 Odum Raja Aadum Rani (2015)

Story
 Man Kolangal (2000).

References

Sources

External links
 

Indian male film actors
Male actors from Kerala
Male actors in Malayalam cinema
Living people
Year of birth missing (living people)
Place of birth missing (living people)
21st-century Indian male actors
Indian male television actors
Male actors in Malayalam television
Malayalam screenwriters